Ursus in the Land of Fire, released directly to U.S. television as Son of Hercules in the Land of Fire, is a 1963 Italian peplum film directed by Giorgio Simonelli and starring Ed Fury as Ursus, and Adriano Micantoni as the evil usurper,  Amilcare.

Plot 

The evil General Amilcare usurps the throne of King Lotar, after murdering him with the aid of the king's niece Mila. He then destroys a nearby village, killing or enslaving the people, which causes local hero Ursus to intervene and combat the dictator. Ursus enters a gladiator tournament in disguise and challenges Amilcare's authority, but is caught and put to manual labour.

King Lotar's daughter, Diana, is still being held prisoner and calls upon the help of Ursus, who escapes and does battle with Amilcare in an underground volcanic cavern.

Cast   
 Ed Fury as  Ursus 
 Claudia Mori as Mila 
 Luciana Gilli as  Princess Diana 
 Adriano Micantoni as  Amilcare/Hamilon
 Nando Tamberlani as Lotar 
 Pietro Ceccarelli as Lero 
 Giuseppe Addobbati as The Magistrate 
 Tom Felleghy as  The Official
 Diego Pozzetto
 Claudia Giannotti
 Pietro Ceccarelli

References

External links

    
Peplum films 
Italian fantasy adventure films
Films directed by Giorgio Simonelli
Sword and sandal films
1960s fantasy adventure films
1960s Italian-language films
1960s Italian films